Between Anglo-Saxon times and the 19th century Cambridgeshire was divided for administrative purposes into 17 hundreds, plus the borough of Cambridge. Each hundred had a separate council that met each month to rule on local judicial and taxation matters.

The shire-system of East Anglia was in all probability not definitively settled before the Norman Conquest, but during the Danish occupation of the 9th century the district possessed a certain military and political organization round Cambridge, its chief town, from where the constitution and demarcation of the later shire most likely originated.

At the time of the Domesday Survey in 1086 the county was divided into the hundreds as they are now, except that the Isle of Ely, which then formed two hundreds having their meeting-place at Witchford, were subsequently divided into the four hundreds of Wisbech, Ely, North Witchford and South Witchford, while Cambridge formed a hundred by itself. The hundred of Flendish was then known as Flamingdike.

During the 19th century the Isle of Ely was divided into the hundreds of Wisbech, North Witchford, South Witchford, and Ely, the Liberty of Whittlesey and Thorney, and the borough of Wisbech.

Parishes

In 1929 the hundreds contained the following parishes.

References

See also
History of Cambridgeshire
List of hundreds of England and Wales

 
Cambridgeshire
Cambridgeshire-related lists